The Conservative People's Party (DKF), also known as The Conservatives is a centre-right political party in Denmark. The party is a member of the European People's Party (EPP) and International Democrat Union (IDC).

History 

The party was founded in 1916 based mostly on its predecessor, Højre ("Right") after its downfall, but also on the Free Conservatives and a moderate faction of the liberal party Venstre ("Left"). The party was a part of the coalition government during World War II, where the leader John Christmas Møller provided the voice for BBC London's daily radio to Denmark. However while a number of conservatives participated in the resistance movement, some conservatives were sympathetic to fascist ideology, and the youth wing of the party praised several fascist movements in Europe during the 1930s.

Since World War II the party has participated in several coalition governments, but only one Prime Minister of Denmark, Poul Schlüter, has come from this party; he served as Prime Minister from 1982 to 1993. His government had to resign after the Tamil Case, when the Justice Minister, Erik Ninn-Hansen (himself a former Conservative leader), was impeached.

The party used its first logo in 1950, consisting of the serif-letter "C" coloured green. On 24 August 2000, the Conservative People's Party rebranded itself as the Conservatives, and at the same time retired its 50-year-old green serif-letter "C" logo, thus launching a new logo for the first time since 1950. The new logo was a circle which contains a chartreuse circle with the letter "C".

From the 2001 parliament elections until 2011, the Conservative People's Party was the junior partner in a coalition government led by Venstre. In the 2004 European parliament elections, the party won a seat. Four months later, on 23 October 2004, it adopted a logo consisting of a green circle-squared box that contains a dark-green screen with the letter "C" that is coloured green; the "Konservative" wordmark is placed below the symbol, though it too is also coloured green. The member is currently Bendt Bendtsen, who is a member of the EPP Group in the European Parliament. In the 2014 European election the party garnered 9.1% of the national vote, retaining Bendtsen's seat as MEP.

In the 2011 parliamentary election for the Folketing (Danish national parliament), the Conservative People's Party won eight seats, 10 fewer than it had won in the previous election in 2007, and it received 4.9% of the vote, placing the party in eighth place nationally. On 27 September 2013, the Conservative People's Party received the current version of its logo: the colour of the letter "C" was changed to white, the circle-square retained its dark-green colour, and the circle-squared line was removed from it. At the same time, the party gave up being known as the Conservatives, reverting to its former name as the Conservative People's Party.

At the 2015 election, the party did badly and was reduced to a mere six seats, which made it the smallest party in the Folketing. But Søren Pape Poulsen (who had taken over as leader the previous year) managed to double the party's seats in the 2019 election. Since then, several opinion polls have indicated that the party enjoys wider popular support than does Venstre.

Organization 
The youth branch of the Conservative People's Party, albeit an independent organisation, is Young Conservatives, the earliest formed youth organisation in Denmark, founded in December 1904, and believed to be one of the oldest in the world, preceding the Conservative People's Party by 10 years. The student branch is Conservative Students, likewise an independent organisation, which has branches at all Danish Universities.

The party remains committed to a centre-right alliance, working most closely with the liberal Venstre and somewhat less closely with the right-wing populist Danish People's Party. The Conservative People's Party cooperated with the Social Liberal Party during its time in power in the 1980s, and also with the centre-left government under Poul Nyrup Rasmussen in the 1990s.

Ideology and policies 
The party's current purpose clause states: "The Conservative People's Party aims to gather everyone who joins the party's program and to work for the spread of conservative views." The party has named Edmund Burke as one of its intellectual sources.

The Conservative People's Party presently advocates individual freedom and responsibility, a free market economy, respecting private property, the importance of community for the individual, modernization of the public sector, decentralization, ensuring up-to-date military defense, and an emphasis on protecting Denmark's national history and traditions. In foreign policy, the party supports economic cooperation with the European Union to aid Denmark's economic growth and keep peace in Europe, but maintains the EU must also respect the right to national identity and calls for a less centralized EU in which member states can maintain sovereignty over their national, regional and local decision making powers. The party also highlights environmentalism as one of its core philosophies in accordance to green conservatism.

List of leaders

Political leaders

Party chairmen

Notable members 

 John Christmas Møller – World War II resistance figure in exile in England.
 Poul Schlüter – The longest-serving Danish prime minister since Thorvald Stauning. Schlüter is the Conservative People's Party's only prime minister to date. He led the Conservative People's Party to its best-ever result at a national election, reaching 23.4% of the national vote. After his term as prime minister ended he was elected to the European Parliament in 1994, reaching a record breaking number of 247,956 personal votes.
 Connie Hedegaard – Appointed as the European Union's first ever European Commissioner for Climate Action in February 2010, Hedegaard was elected to the Danish Parliament as a member for the Conservative People's Party in 1984 at the age of 23, becoming the youngest Danish MP ever at that time. In 1989, Hedegaard became first spokesperson for the Conservative People's Party, but left politics for journalism in 1990.
 Stefan G. Rasmussen (born 23 July 1947), a former Danish pilot who captained the crash-landing SAS flight 751 on 27 December 1991, in which there were no fatalities. He then entered politics, serving in the Danish Folketing from 1994 to 1996.

Electoral performance

Parliament

Local elections

European Parliament

Notes

References

External links

 Official website 

 
Political parties established in 1916
Liberal conservative parties
Green conservative parties
Conservative parties in Denmark
International Democrat Union member parties
1916 establishments in Denmark
Social conservative parties
Member parties of the European People's Party